Al-Faqir Fort (Arabic: قلعة الفقير) is an 18th-century fort situated in the Levantine pilgrimage route on a small hilltop in the southern portion of modern-day Al-'Ula, Saudi Arabia. The fort takes a squared form with round towers, three of which are standing while the southern one was completely destroyed. The fort occupies 340 m2 with approximate height of slightly over 6 m tall walls, that appears to be originally two-storey structure supported by wooden beams.

Most of the interior walls, ceilings, and stairs of the fort were destroyed. Nothing left except for the walls and towers along with small interior remains.

Building materials and history

The fort was originally known in historical documents as the fort of al-Hafa'ir. It was built by the Ottoman dynasty to facilitate the pilgrimage process and to protect the pilgrims in their journey to the holy sites.

Varieties of materials were used during the construction, primarily local limestones and sandstones (also schist and gneiss)  additional to the employment of bricks on the upper levels and in different parts of the structure.

See also
 Masmak fort
 Ajyad Fortress

References 

Ottoman fortifications
Forts in Saudi Arabia
Castles in Saudi Arabia